Karron is a locality in the Shire of Croydon, Queensland, Australia.

Geography 
Karron is in the Gulf Country in Far North Queensland. A number of creeks including Walker Creek, Fish Hole Creek, Wills Creek, and Rocky Creek, flow from west to east through the locality. These creeks all become tributaries of the Norman River which enters the Gulf of Carpentaria at Karumba.

The principal land use is cattle grazing. There are three large pastoral stations which occupy Karron: Mutton Hole pastoral station ( in the west of the locality, Clotilda pastoral station in the south-east, and Miranda Downs pastoral station in the north-east extending into neighbouring Howitt.

History 
Although not officially stated, the locality presumably takes its name from the Karron pastoral station, which is not within the locality's boundaries but is immediately adjacent in neighbouring Blackbull. The pastoral station probably takes its name from the Carron River which flows through the property. The river in turn is named after William Carron who was second in command of the Edmund Kennedy expedition in 1848. Carron was the expedition botanist and one of the three survivors of the venture.

References 

Shire of Croydon
Localities in Queensland